Wachusett Mountain is an alpine ski area in the northeastern United States, located on Mount Wachusett, in the towns of Princeton and Westminster, Worcester County, Massachusetts. It has 25 trails served by eight lifts, including three high-speed chairlifts and three magic-carpet lifts, a triple chairlift, and a Pony lift (rope tow).

There is a weekend shuttle service to and from a MBTA commuter stop in nearby Fitchburg.

Wachusett Mountain has 100% snow-making capacity, and also has night skiing on most of its trails. The mountain is located in the Northeastern part of Massachusetts, with the closest major city being Worcester.

History 

The first ski trails were cut into Mount Wachusett by the Civilian Conservation Corps in 1934 and 1937. Those trails were called Pine Hill Trail and Balance Rock. Today, skiers can still ski down the upper and lower half of Balance rock. The middle section closed in the 1980s.  During World War II, the 10th Mountain Division trained at Wachusett. There is now a plaque at the summit commemorating this. The first lifts installed were a T-bar in 1960 (the Oxbow T-Bar) and in 1962 (the West T-Bar). .

The Massachusetts State Downhill ski championships were run on the Pine Hill Trail until 1966. The race was called off that year after 3 racers were injured and moved in the years following to the Balance Rock Trail until ski area expansion cut that trail in 1983.

In 1969, Ralph Crowley was granted a lease for a  parcel of land on Mount Wachusett by the state to operate the ski area. In 1982, a major expansion was completed which included the construction of the base lodge.

Stands of old growth hardwood forest on Mount Wachusett became the object of a court ruling in favor of the Commonwealth of Massachusetts in joint contract with the ski area regarding plans for a ski slope expansion into an environmental buffer zone around the old growth stand. The old-growth forest contains trees over 350 years old; the buffer zone contained mature trees about half that age. The Sierra Club and other conservation organizations criticized the ruling and two members of Earth First! staged a sit-in protest by climbing into the crowns of several of the trees in the area slated to be clear cut. As of 2007 wording on the website of the Wachusett Mountain Ski Area included strong language prohibiting skiers and snow boarders from entering the old growth area: "Anyone found entering old growth areas will have their lift ticket revoked. Subsequent offenses will be subject to fines."

Mountain information 

The resort features 27 trails, ranging in difficulty from easiest (green circle) to most difficult (black diamond). Amidst these trails is a terrain park and a racing venue. Two high-speed chairlifts (Minuteman and Polar Express) service the two main peaks as well as a newer high-speed lift for the beginner area (Monadnock Express). One additional 3-person chairlift (Vickery Bowl) services the mid-mountain area. Two magic carpets service the mountain's training slopes with a third open only during weekends and holiday periods for ski school lessons for young children.

In 2006, the National Ski Patrol named Wachusett Mountain Ski Patrol as the best Large Alpine Patrol in the country.

It contains public areas, a cafeteria, The Black Diamond restaurant, and private suites, that are available for daily rental.

The resort used to include the nearby Wachusett Village Inn, which provided overnight accommodations. The Inn was sold in 2016 and is now a rehabilitation center owned and operated by Recovery Centers Of America.

Trails

Lifts 

Wachusett has 4 chairlifts, and 4 surface lifts.

See also 
 Midstate Trail (Massachusetts)

References

External links 
 Wachusett Mountain Ski Area
 Wachusett Mountain State Reservation
 Trail Map
Massachusetts  - Resort Info & Mountain Stats
Skilifts.org - Wachusett Mountain, MA
Wachusett Mountain - Vickery Bowl & Magic Carpet

Wachusett Ski Area, Mount
Wachusett Ski Area, Mount
Wachusett Ski Area, Mount
Civilian Conservation Corps in Massachusetts